WHEL (93.7 FM) is a radio station licensed to Sanibel, Florida, broadcasting to the Fort Myers/Naples area. Owned by Sun Broadcasting, it broadcasts a country music format under the branding of Hell Yeah 93.7.

History 
The station was originally a local signal licensed to Naples, and located at 93.5 on the FM band. Beginning its life as WLAJ-FM in December 1971, the station changed its call letters to WRGI in 1974. It was later known as "G-93.5" airing a Top 40 format, but flipped to adult contemporary afterward during the late 1970s. In 1987, the station returned back to Top 40 when it became "Lazer 93.5". Retaining its WRGI call letters, its call letters back to the former WLAZ as "Lazer 93.5" in 1989. Its Top 40 format only lasted for nearly three years. Its format changed to classic rock and returned back to its WRGI call letters on November 19, 1990. Its format would later shift to an oldies format. In mid-September 1994, the station dropped the format and WRGI call letters for a simulcast of WNOG airing a talk format. On February 17, 1997, WNOG-FM became WPRW with a Dance Radio format with the station's moniker name "Power 93.5", reminiscent of WPBT "Power 89.5", a simulcast of now-defunct 91.5, "The Spark". This lasted until March 24, 1999, when the station flipped to soft adult contemporary as "Lite 93.5" with their call letters WTLT. Its format would later upgrade to normal adult contemporary.

In late 2002, WTLT's frequency changed from 93.5 to 93.7 FM, which allowed an increase in its coverage area. In 2010, WTLT moved its transmitter closer to Fort Myers, in order to more effectively cover Lee County, and the northern part of the market.

On June 19, 2013, after Beasley Broadcast Group shifted the part of the active rock format from WJBX to portions of the day on WRXK-FM to make room for the move of ESPN Radio to 99.3 FM, WTLT dropped its "Lite 93.7" adult contemporary format and assumed the "X" moniker and active rock format. On June 26, 2013, WTLT changed its call letters to WXNX.

On September 16, 2020, the station flipped to automated country music as "Trump Country 93.7", with no airstaff, and promos performed by a Donald Trump impersonator. The 93X Facebook page announced that it would be "back on a new channel soon!"

On December 18, 2020, WXNX rebranded as "Hell Yeah 93.7" under new WHEL call letters, lacking the Trump continuity promos and still without an airstaff.

The station's programmer claimed the switch was made due to Joe Biden campaign officials reaching out to the station with threats that Biden's new FCC make-up would revoke the station's license upon his taking office on January 20, 2021, due to alleged equal time violations, though this was likely promotional hyperbole, as both the campaign and FCC never commented on the claims. The programmer also claimed they wanted calls and branding with the word "fuck" in them (a move that in reality, would have been rejected by the FCC immediately), but were rebuffed by Sun Broadcasting's attorneys.

On October 5, 2022, after being off the air due to Hurricane Ian making landfall in the Fort Myers area, WHEL returned to the air with the "Latino" Spanish-language contemporary hit radio format normally heard on WTLQ-FM (97.7), which was still off the air at the time. On October 21, 2022, WTLQ-FM returned to the air, allowing WHEL to resume its "Hell Yeah" country format.

HD Radio
WHEL airs an active rock format on its HD2 subchannel, branded as "Rock 103.3".

On March 7, 2022, WHEL-HD2 changed formats from Regional Mexican to active rock, branded as "Rock 103.3".

Translators
WHEL broadcasts its HD2 subchannel on the following translator:

References

External links

FCC Call Sign Changes, Mass Media Public Notice, May 1999
ECFS Filing: InterMart Broadcasting, May 4th, 1999

HEL
Country radio stations in the United States
1971 establishments in Florida
Radio stations established in 1971